Asthma is a 2014 American romantic drama film written and directed by Jake Hoffman and starring Benedict Samuel and Krysten Ritter. It is Hoffman's directorial debut.

Premise
Gus is a young rock and roller who steals a white Rolls-Royce and invites a beautiful tattoo artist named Ruby on a joyride out of the city where they smoke and talk about life.

Cast
Benedict Samuel as Gus
Krysten Ritter as Ruby
Nick Nolte as Werewolf (voice)
Rosanna Arquette as Gus' mother
Goran Višnjić as Ragen
Dov Tiefenbach as Logan Backer
Iggy Pop as local drunk
Rene Ricard as Juan
Joey Kern as Bottle Cap
Gillian Zinser as Kara
Carlen Altman as Bree
Annabelle Dexter-Jones as Lilly
Chelsea Schuchman as Nicole
Jerry Zucker as Gus' father

Reception
Rotten Tomatoes gives the film an approval rating of 10%, based on 10 reviews, with an average rating of 3.8/10. On Metacritic, the film has a score of 41 out of 100, based on 6 reviews.

Tom Keogh of The Seattle Times wrote that the film "loses its spark and momentum long before the halfway point — a genuine disappointment."

Katie Walsh of the Los Angeles Times wrote that the film "suffers from near-lethal doses of self-satisfied hipness."

References

External links
 
 

2014 independent films
2010s road movies
2014 romantic drama films
2014 films
American independent films
American road movies
American romantic drama films
Films set in New York City
Films shot in New York City
2014 directorial debut films
2010s English-language films
2010s American films